The fulvous-bellied climbing rat (Tylomys fulviventer) is a species of rodent in the family Cricetidae.
It is found only in Panama.

References

Sources
Musser, G. G. and M. D. Carleton. 2005. Superfamily Muroidea. pp. 894–1531 in Mammal Species of the World a Taxonomic and Geographic Reference. D. E. Wilson and D. M. Reeder eds. Johns Hopkins University Press, Baltimore.

Tylomys
Mammals described in 1916
Taxonomy articles created by Polbot